Yatesville Creek is a river in Montgomery County in the state of New York. It begins northeast of Charleston Four Corners and flows in a general northwest direction before converging with the Mohawk River in Randall. The creek flows through the  Yatesville Falls State Forest which was purchased by the state in the 1930s. Within the state forest is Yatesville Falls, also known as Buttermilk Falls, is located on the creek. On a land grant, dated 1727, it is referred to by the Indian name "Wasontha".

History
A Mohawk Indian village, known as Onekagonka, was located at or near the mouth of Yatesville Creek.

References 

Rivers of Montgomery County, New York
Mohawk River
Rivers of New York (state)